Solidary Democracy (DemoS) is a Christian-leftist political party in Italy. The party's early leader, Lorenzo Dellai has described it as a "Christian-social" party. DemoS is led by Paolo Ciani; several party members, including Ciani himself, hail from the Community of Sant'Egidio.

DemoS maintains solid relations with the Democratic Party. It also had relations with a number of alike minor parties/groups of the Christian left, notably including the Democratic Centre (with which DemoS formed a joint parliamentary group in the Chamber of Deputies in 2014–2018), the Christian Popular Union (active mainly in Sardinia) and the Union for Trentino (Dellai's long-time party in Trentino, of which he was President in 1999–2012).

History
DemoS was formed in July 2014, following the split of the left-wing faction from the Populars for Italy (PpI). The party, led by Lorenzo Dellai, Andrea Olivero, Mario Marazziti, Mario Giro and Lucio Romano, re-affirmed the strategic (not just tactical) alliance with Matteo Renzi's Democratic Party (PD), while the PpI considered it temporary and wanted to restructure the centre-right camp instead. At its start, the party counted eight deputies, two senators, one deputy minister and one undersecretary.

In November 2014 the "For Italy" group in the Chamber welcomed the two deputies of the Democratic Centre (CD). In December the two senators of DemoS, Olivero and Romano, left the "For Italy" group, which was later disbanded, to join For the Autonomies, a miscellaneous group composed of minor autonomist and/or centre-left parties. In September a ninth deputy, Maurizio Baradello, joined the party and the parliamentary group; Baradello would die in May 2017.

In early 2015 Demos adopted a new symbol, Dellai was elected president of the party and Paolo Ciani coordinator.

In January 2016 the "For Italy" group changed its name to "Solidary Democracy – Democratic Centre", following a strengthening of the alliance with CD. In February Giro, formerly an undersecretary, became deputy minister of Foreign Affairs; Giro was thus one of the party's two deputy ministers, along with Olivero at Agriculture.

In June and December 2017, respectively, Fucsia Nissoli and Gianluigi Gigli joined Forza Italia (FI) and Energies for Italy (EpI), both members of the centre-right coalition. For its part, DemoS was a founding member of the Popular Civic List (CP), a centrist electoral list within the centre-left coalition, along with Popular Alternative (AP), Italy of Values (IdV), the Centrists for Europe (CpE), Italy is Popular (IP), the Union for Trentino (UpT) and the Christian Popular Union (UPC).

In the 2018 general election CP obtained a mere 0.5% and no seats, thus DemoS was excluded from Parliament. Moreover, Dellai was defeated in a single-seat constituency in Trentino. However, in the simultaneous 2018 regional election in Lazio, Ciani was elected regional councillor, at the head of a regional list named "Solidary Centre".

In October 2018 DemoS was re-launched, with the aim of creating a large Christian-leftist movement within the centre-left, at the presence of Andrea Riccardi, founder of the Community of Sant'Egidio, and Paolo Gentiloni, a leading Democrat, former Prime Minister and minister of Foreign Affairs. In the following months, the party was joined by some high-profile people, including Nello Formisano and Pietro Bartolo, while Michela Rostan, deputy of Article One, expressed her willingness to represent the issues put forward by Demo.S in the Parliament. The party also joined the PD's lists for the 2019 European Parliament election, resulting in the election of Bartolo as MEP.

In May 2022 the party held its first national congress. Ciani, until then coordinator, was elected secretary, while Giro was re-elected president.

Leadership
President: Lorenzo Dellai (2015–2018), Mario Giro (2018–present)
Coordinator/Secretary: Paolo Ciani (2015–present)

Symbol

References

External links
Official website

2014 establishments in Italy
Centrist parties in Italy
Christian democratic parties in Italy
Catholic political parties
Political parties established in 2014
Left-wing politics in Italy